The Campeonato Carioca (Carioca Championship), officially known as Campeonato Estadual do Rio de Janeiro (Port., Rio de Janeiro State Championship), was started in 1906 and is the annual football championship in the state of Rio de Janeiro, Brazil. It is under the authority of the FERJ or FFERJ (Football Federation of the State of Rio de Janeiro).

The first season of the Campeonato Carioca was played in 1906. It was predated by: the Campeonato Paulista of São Paulo and the Campeonato Baiano of Bahia.

Rivalries amongst four of the most prestigious Brazilian teams (Botafogo, Flamengo, Fluminense and Vasco da Gama) have marked the history of the competition.

The oldest clubs from Rio de Janeiro (America, Botafogo, Flamengo, Fluminense, São Cristóvão, Vasco da Gama) had inspired the creation of many clubs from other states.

Flamengo leads the title count with 37 championships, followed by Fluminense (32), Vasco da Gama (24), Botafogo (21), America (7), Bangu (2), São Cristóvão, and Paysandu (1 each).

History

The early years
The 20th century saw in Rio de Janeiro and Niterói a significant popularity in football with the establishment of clubs such as Rio Cricket and Athletic Association in Niterói, Fluminense Football Club in 1902, and Bangu Atlético Club, América Football Club, and Botafogo Football Club in 1904 being founded. Organizing leagues for competition amongst clubs followed by Rio Cricket and Athletic Association, Fluminense Football Club, Football and Athletic Club, America Football Club, Bangu Atlético Club, Sport Club Petrópolis and Payssandu Cricket Club. On June 8, 1905, the Liga Metropolitana de Football (abbreviated LMF, Metropolitan Football League in English) was founded. LMF's first president was Bangu's José Villas Boas, who was replaced by Francis Walter in December of the same year.

In 1906, the first Campeonato Carioca was contested by six clubs: Fluminense, Botafogo, Bangu, Football and Athletic, Payssandu and Rio Cricket. America, despite being one of the league founders, did not contest the league's first edition. Fluminense became the first Rio de Janeiro state champion.

In 1907, the championship ended with a tie between Botafogo and Fluminense. The league rules did not address ties. Botafogo claimed an extra-match advantage; Fluminense claimed that the league should adopt the goal-average criteria. It went unresolved until 1996 when both clubs were declared champions.

On February 29, 1908, Fluminense, Botafogo, America, Paysandu, Rio Cricket, and Riachuelo founded Liga Metropolitana de Sports Athleticos (LMSA, meaning Metropolitan Athletic Sports League), the organizer of the 1908 Campeonato Carioca. Fluminense won.

The splits of the league

AFRJ: the first split
The first league split was in 1911 when Botafogo left LMSA and founded Associação de Football do Rio de Janeiro (AFRJ - Rio de Janeiro Football Association). The league was nicknamed Liga Barbante (String League), because Botafogo was the only significant club to question the full realisation of the sport under LMSA. AFRJ was incorporated by LMSA in 1913.

LMDT: 1917-1932
In 1917, several accusations of bribery caused LMSA to rebrand as Liga Metropolitana de Desportos Terrestres (Terrestrial Sports Metropolitan League) (LMDT). Fluminense won the competition of that year.

AMEA: the second split
On March 1, 1924, a second league split occurred, and Associação Metropolitana de Esportes Athleticos (Athletic Sports Metropolitan Association) was founded. AMEA, founded by the "aristocratic" clubs Flamengo, Fluminense, Botafogo and America, with restrictions on its blacks and lower class citizens to their members. The Confederação Brasileira de Desportos (CBD - Brazilian Sports Confederation) remained with AMEA recognizing it as the official league of Rio de Janeiro from 1924 on, and disassociating with LMDT. AMEA's competition was won by Fluminense. LMDT's (The league was nicknamed Liga Barbante) (String League) competition was won by Vasco da Gama, the only significant club that remained on the old league. In 1925, AMEA rescinded its racial conditions and Vasco left LMDT, while LMDT continued with its minor clubs. Years later, the LMDT championship of 1924 was considered official - but not the following LMDT championships.

Professionalization and the union of the league
On January 23, 1933, Bangu, Fluminense, Vasco and America founded the first professional league of Rio de Janeiro, Liga Carioca de Futebol (LCF) (Carioca Football League). The Confederação Brasileira de Desportos was an amateur-only league supported AMEA. For this reason, LCF was nicknamed "pirate league". In 1934 CBD finally accepted professionalism, but LCF and AMEA did not merge for political reasons. On December 11, 1934, Botafogo, Vasco, Bangu, São Cristóvão, Andaraí, Olaria, Carioca and Madureira founded the professional Federação Metropolitana de Desportos (FMD) (Sports Metropolitan Federation), replacing AMEA as the official Rio de Janeiro league affiliated to CBD.

In 1937, the Brazilian football clubs were professionalized. On July 29, 1937, FMD and LCF merged, creating Liga de Football do Rio de Janeiro (Rio de Janeiro Football League), also called LFRJ. In 1941, LFRJ rebranded as Federação Metropolitana de Futebol (FMF) (Metropolitan Football Federation). The occasion was celebrated by a friendly match between Vasco da Gama and America that would come to be nicknamed Clássico da Paz (Peace Derby) for any game played between the two teams.

Federação Carioca de Futebol (FCF)
On April 21, 1960, the Brazilian capital city became Brasília, so, Federação Metropolitana de Futebol rebranded as Federação Carioca de Futebol (FCF) (Carioca Football Federation). América won the state championship of that year.

After 1975
On March 15, 1975, Rio de Janeiro and Guanabara states merged under the name of Rio de Janeiro.

On September 29, 1978, Federação de Futebol do Estado do Rio de Janeiro (Rio de Janeiro State Football Federation) (FERJ), was founded, after Guanabara state's FCF and Rio de Janeiro state's FFD (Federação Fluminense de Desportos, or Fluminense Sports Federation) fused.

In 1979, there was an extra Campeonato Carioca which also included the countryside state teams, which, until that year, contested the Campeonato Fluminense. This extra competition, known as Primeiro Campeonato Estadual de Profissionais (First Professionals State Championship) was won by Flamengo, which was also the champion of the regular competition, but did not count in the overall titles.

In 1996, Taça Cidade Maravilhosa was contested only by clubs from Rio de Janeiro city. This competition was contested by eight teams (America, Bangu, Botafogo, Flamengo, Fluminense, Madureira, Olaria and Vasco da Gama), which played against each other once. Botafogo was the champion, Flamengo being the runner up. In the same year, a state championship was played, won by Flamengo.

Format
The competition is usually divided in three stages: the traditional Taça Guanabara, Taça Rio and the Finals.

Taça Guanabara is the first stage of the competition, with the teams divided into two groups. The traditional "big four", namely, Botafogo, Flamengo, Fluminense and Vasco da Gama are seeded—two teams of the "big four" put into each group. It is possible other teams also be seeded in some ways, but the seeding criteria are not codified in the regulation and has never been publicly available. The teams play one match with each team in their group. The top team in each group plays the second team in the semi-finals; the winners qualify for the final match.

Taça Rio is the second stage of the competition. Teams are divided into the two same groups of Taça Guanabara, but each team plays once against every team from the other group. The top team from each group compete in the semi-finals with the second team from the opposite group, and winners of the semi-finals compete for the Taça Rio.

The winners of Taça Guanabara and Taça Rio compete in the two-legged finals of Campeonato Carioca, with the winner champion.

2020 members

List of champions and top scorers

Amateur era

Professional era

Titles by club

Participation

Most appearances

Below is the list of clubs that have more appearances in the Campeonato Carioca.

Topscorers

The 25 top score for team of the history of the Campeonato Carioca, all Brazilian, except the English Henry Welfare:

 284 goals: Roberto Dinamite (Vasco da Gama)
 239 goals: Zico (Flamengo)
 233 goals: Romário (Vasco, Flamengo e Fluminense)
 197 goals: Ademir de Menezes (Vasco e Fluminense)
 196 goals: Nilo (Botafogo, Brasil e Fluminense)
 172 goals: Ladislau da Guia (Bangu e Canto do Rio)
 166 goals: Carvalho Leite (Botafogo)
 164 goals: Russinho (Andarahy, Vasco e Botafogo)
 156 goals: Luizinho Lemos (America, Flamengo, Botafogo e Americano)
 153 goals: Zizinho (Flamengo e Bangu)
 151 goals: Sylvio Pirillo (Flamengo e Botafogo)
 149 goals: Quarentinha (Botafogo e Bonsucesso)
 133 goals: Heleno de Freitas (Botafogo e Vasco)
 125 goals: Leônidas da Silva (Syrio e Libanez, Bonsucesso, Flamengo e Botafogo)
 123 goals: Henry Welfare (Fluminense)
 118 goals: Didi (Madureira, Fluminense e Botafogo)
 114 goals: Pinga (Vasco)
 112 goals: Cláudio Adão (Flamengo, Fluminense, Vasco, Bangu, Campo Grande e Volta Redonda)
 105 goals: Perácio (Botafogo, Flamengo e Canto do Rio)
 105 goals: Plácido (Bangu e America)
 102 goals: Orlando Pingo de Ouro (Fluminense e Botafogo)
 102 goals: Waldo Machado (Fluminense)
 100 goals: Preguinho (Fluminense)
 99 goals: Chico (Vasco da Gama) 
 98 goals: Bebeto (Flamengo, Vasco e Botafogo)
 96 goals: Hércules (Fluminense)
 Paysandu Cricket Club abandoned football activities in 1914. Nowadays it is called Paissandu Atlético Clube, and it is a social club only.

See also
Campeonato Carioca Série B
Taça Guanabara
Taça Rio

References

MÉRCIO, Roberto. A História dos Campeonatos Cariocas de Futebol. Rio de Janeiro: Ed. FERJ.

External links

FFERJ Official Website
League at soccerway.com
Campeonato Carioca in RSSSF
Ranking Carioca
Best Attendances in Campeonato Carioca
Vital Statistics of the Rio de Janeiro State Main Football Clubs
Fla-Flu and the Carioca Cup

 
Carioca
Football leagues in Rio de Janeiro (state)